Mann House may refer to:

in the United States
(by state)
Mann House (Forrest City, Arkansas), listed on the National Register of Historic Places (NRHP)
John T. Mann House, Cave Spring, Georgia, listed on the NRHP in Floyd County, Georgia
Mann House (Russell, Kansas), listed on the NRHP in Russell County, Kansas
James H. Mann House, Winchester, Massachusetts, NRHP-listed
Mann House (Concord, Michigan), NRHP-listed
Mann-Zwonecek House, Wilber, Nebraska, NRHP-listed
Henry Mann House, Albuquerque, New Mexico, NRHP-listed
Mann-Simons Cottage, Columbia, South Carolina, NRHP-listed
Irene and Walter Mann Ranch, Custer, South Dakota, listed on the NRHP in Custer County, South Dakota
R.N. Mann House, Old Salem, Tennessee, NRHP-listed
Brown-Mann House, McGregor, Texas, formerly listed on the NRHP in McLennan County, Texas
John Wesley Mann House, Waco, Texas, listed on the NRHP in McLennan County, Texas
John Mann House, Fitchburg, Wisconsin, NRHP-listed
William G. Mann House, Waukesha, Wisconsin, listed on the NRHP in Waukesha County, Wisconsin